Henry James Adams (25 April 1852 – 21 February 1922) was an English first-class cricketer.  Adams' was a right-handed batsman who fielded as a wicket-keeper and who could also bowl right-arm medium pace.  He was born at Croydon, Surrey.

Adams made his first-class debut for Surrey against Sussex in 1887.  He made three further first-class appearances for the county, the last of which came against Cambridge University in 1889.  In his five first-class matches for Surrey, he scored 25 runs at an average of 8.33, with a high score of 9.  Behind the stumps he took 4 catches and made 2 stumpings.  He also made a single first-class appearance for CI Thornton's XI against the touring Australians in 1888.  He was dismissed for a duck twice in the match, both times by J. J. Ferris.

He died at Edmonton, Middlesex on 21 February 1922.

References

External links 
Henry Adams at ESPNcricinfo
Henry Adams at CricketArchive

1852 births
1922 deaths
Cricketers from Croydon
English cricketers
Surrey cricketers
C. I. Thornton's XI cricketers
Wicket-keepers